Charles Frederick Crocker (December 26, 1854 – July 17, 1897) was vice president of the Southern Pacific Railroad Company.

Biography
He was born in Sacramento on December 26, 1854, the eldest son of Mary Ann and Charles Crocker. He was educated in Sacramento public schools, graduated from Oakland Military Academy in 1872 and attended the Brooklyn Polytechnic School (1875), but did not graduate as a result of poor eyesight.

After taking a trip to Japan, Crocker entered the family railroad business at the age of 22 as a clerk in the Fourth and Townsend Streets office of Southern Pacific. When George C. Perkins was elected governor in 1879, he appointed Crocker as a colonel in the National Guard. By 1888, Crocker was president of the San Joaquin and Sierra Nevada Railroad.

Crocker purchased the 'Uplands' estate (then part of San Mateo and later incorporated into Hillsborough) from William Henry Howard in 1894. Crocker died at 'Uplands' on July 17, 1897, from complications of Bright's Disease following a brief, acute paralysis. His wife, the former Jennie Marine Easton, had died during the birth of their third child.

Legacy
Crocker was survived by three children: Mary Crocker (who would later marry the congressman Francis Burton Harrison), Charles Templeton Crocker (who became a noted scientist), and Jennie Adeline Crocker.

Crocker was notably active in public affairs, serving as one of the Regents of the University of California (appointed in 1888 by Governor Waterman), as president of the California Academy of Sciences, and as a trustee of Stanford University.

Family members

Crocker's brothers were banker and investor William H. Crocker, president of the Crocker Bank and George Crocker, second vice-president of the Southern Pacific Railroad. His cousin was the mystic, princess and author Aimee Crocker. His uncle Edwin B. Crocker built Sacramento's Crocker Art Museum.

Family tree

References

1854 births
1897 deaths
Southern Pacific Railroad people
Wells Fargo employees
Crocker family
20th-century American businesspeople
19th-century American businesspeople
 deaths from kidney failure